The women's cross-country mountain biking at the 2008 Summer Olympics took place at the Laoshan Mountain Bike Course on August 23, 2008.

Germany's Sabine Spitz opened up a commanding, one-minute lead from the rest of the field and then stayed out in front to a spectacular finish with a gold-medal time in 1:45:11. Trailing behind the leader by more than forty seconds, Poland's Maja Włoszczowska took home the silver in 1:45:52, while Russian rider Irina Kalentieva held off a tight battle with Canada's Catharine Pendrel down the final lap to grab the bronze in 1:46:28. Among the 30 mountain bikers who competed in the cross-country race, only eighteen of them managed to complete the full distance.

Competition format
The competition began at 10:00 am with a mass-start in which riders are positioned according to their current world ranking so that the higher-ranked riders are near the front. The cross-country race also involved six laps, with 172 m of elevation change for each, around the 4.45 km course at Laoshan Mountain Bike Course. The overall distance of the race was 26.70 km.

Schedule 
All times are China standard time (UTC+8)

Result

References

Cycling at the 2008 Summer Olympics
2008 Women
Olym
Women's events at the 2008 Summer Olympics